Ayene is a town in Equatorial Guinea. It is located in the Añisok district in the province of Wele-Nzas and has a (2005 est.) population of 3482.

References

Populated places in Wele-Nzas